The Chantalvergyrgyn, also called the Chantalveergyn, is a stream located in Chukotka Autonomous Okrug, in the Far East of Russia. It flows roughly northeastwards and then eastwards from Central Chukotka into the Ekityki from its left side. Its source is very close to the Arctic Circle.

The Chantalvergyrgyn limits the western side of the Chantal Range of the Chukotka Mountains, just south of the Iskhodnaya. It passes through sparsely populated areas. Winters in its area are long and bitter, so that its surface remains frozen for over eight months every year. Salmon, whitefish, vendace, grayling, rainbow herring, pike, burbot, bull trout, and loach are common in its waters.

References

External links
Tourism and Environmental data

Rivers of Chukotka Autonomous Okrug
Chukotka Mountains
Tributaries of the Amguema